Fred Morris may refer to:
 Fred Morris (bishop) (1884–1965), Anglican bishop in North Africa
 Fred Morris (footballer, born 1893) (1893–1962), English football player for West Bromwich Albion
 Fred Morris (footballer, born 1929) (1929–1998), English football player for Walsall and Liverpool
 Freddie Morris (1920–1973), English football player for Barnsley and Southend United

See also
 Frederick Morris, former Irish High Court judge
 Frederick Morris (sailor) (1905–1971), American sailor
 Frederick Maurice (disambiguation)